Pankey is a North American last name and the Anglicized form of the German-language surname Pahnke, which in itself is derived from the diminutive form pank/panek of the Lower Sorbian/Upper Sorbian/Polish word pan for "man", "master" or "mister" (and can thus roughly be translated as "little gentleman", “young noble” or "junker"). 
Notable people with the surname include:

 Ashton Pankey  (born 1992), American basketball player
 Aubrey Pankey (1905–1971), African American baritone 
 Eric Pankey (born 1959), American poet and artist
 Irv Pankey (born 1958), former American football offensive lineman
 Susan Pedersen Pankey (born 1953), American swimmer
 Titus Pankey Jr. (1925-2003), African American physicist

References

English-language surnames
Surnames from nicknames